Mellösa (locally ) is a locality situated in Flen Municipality, Södermanland County, Sweden. It had 535 inhabitants in 2010.
In 2001, Mellösa became the first book town in Sweden.

Riksdag elections

References 

Populated places in Södermanland County
Populated places in Flen Municipality